Dean Howard may refer to:

 Dean Howard (musician) (born 1961), guitarist
 Dean Howard (footballer) (born 1976), former Australian rules footballer